Tony Kaye is the name of:
 Tony Kaye (musician) (born 1946), keyboardist with the bands Yes, Badger, Detective and Badfinger
 Tony Kaye (director) (born 1952), director of American History X and Lake of Fire

See also
Tony Kay, footballer
Antony Kay, Barnsley footballer